The 1982 Giro d'Italia was the 65th running of the Giro. It started in Brescia, on 13 May, with a  team time trial and concluded in Turin, on 6 June, with a  individual time trial. A total of 162 riders from eighteen teams entered the 22-stage race, that was won by Frenchman Bernard Hinault of the Renault–Elf team. The second and third places were taken by Swede Tommy Prim and Italian Silvano Contini, respectively.

Amongst the other classifications that the race awarded, Famcucine's Francesco Moser won the points classification, Lucien Van Impe of Metauro Mobili won the mountains classification, and Metauro Mobili's Marco Groppo completed the Giro as the best neo-professional in the general classification, finishing ninth overall. Bianchi finishing as the winners of the team classification, ranking each of the twenty teams contesting the race by lowest cumulative time. In addition, Bianchi won the team points classification.

Teams

A total of eighteen teams were invited to participate in the 1982 Giro d'Italia. Each team sent a squad of nine riders, which meant that the race started with a peloton of 162 cyclists. From the riders that began this edition, 110 made it to the finish in Turin.

The teams entering the race were:

Route and stages

The route for the 1982 edition of the Giro d'Italia was revealed to the public by head organizer Vincenzo Torriani on 20 February 1982. Four of these eleven stages had summit finishes: stage 11, to Camigliatello Silano; stage 12, to Campitello Matese; stage 16, to San Martino di Castrozza; and stage 19, to Colli di San Fermo. The organizers chose to include two rest days. When compared to the previous year's race, the race was  longer and contained one less time trial. In addition, this race contained one less set of split stages.

Classification leadership

Four different jerseys were worn during the 1982 Giro d'Italia. The leader of the general classification – calculated by adding the stage finish times of each rider, and allowing time bonuses for the first three finishers on mass-start stages – wore a pink jersey. This classification is the most important of the race, and its winner is considered as the winner of the Giro.

For the points classification, which awarded a purple (or cyclamen) jersey to its leader, cyclists were given points for finishing a stage in the top 15; additional points could also be won in intermediate sprints. The green jersey was awarded to the mountains classification leader. In this ranking, points were won by reaching the summit of a climb ahead of other cyclists. Each climb was ranked as either first, second or third category, with more points available for higher category climbs. The Cima Coppi, the race's highest point of elevation, awarded more points than the other first category climbs. The Cima Coppi for this Giro was the Col d'Izoard. The first rider to cross the Col d'Izoard was Belgian rider Lucien Van Impe. The white jersey was worn by the leader of young rider classification, a ranking decided the same way as the general classification, but considering only neo-professional cyclists (in their first three years of professional racing).

Although no jersey was awarded, there was also one classification for the teams, in which the stage finish times of the best three cyclists per team were added; the leading team was the one with the lowest total time. There was another team classification that awarded points to each team based on their riding's finishing position in every stage. The team with the highest total of points was the leader of the classification.

The rows in the following table correspond to the jerseys awarded after that stage was run.

Final standings

General classification

Points classification

Mountains classification

Young rider classification

Traguardi Fiat classification

Team classification

Team points classification

References

Footnotes

Citations

 
1982
Giro d'Italia
Giro d'Italia
Giro d'Italia
Giro d'Italia
1982 Super Prestige Pernod